Mycetocola saprophilus is a bacterium from the genus Mycetocola which has been isolated from the cultivated mushroom Pleurotus ostreatus in Japan.

References

Microbacteriaceae
Bacteria described in 2001